The Secretary for Planning and Lands was a ministerial position in the Hong Kong Government, responsible for urban planning policy and the management and selling of public lands. The position was created on 1 January 2000 to take over some duties of Secretary for Planning, Environment and Lands, and was abolished in 2002 after merging with Secretary for Housing to become Secretary for Housing, Planning and Lands.

Defunct positions of the Hong Kong Government